is a Japanese politician of the Democratic Party and a member of the House of Councillors in the Diet (national legislature). He server as  Vice President of the House of Councillors.

Overview 
A native of Mito, Ibaraki and dropout of Meiji Gakuin University, he was elected to the House of Councillors for the first time in 1998.

References

External links 
 Official website in Japanese.

Members of the House of Councillors (Japan)
Living people
1949 births
People from Mito, Ibaraki
Meiji Gakuin University alumni
Democratic Party of Japan politicians
Noda cabinet
Ministers of Agriculture, Forestry and Fisheries of Japan